Esquisses (Sketches), Op. 63 is a set of 49 short piano pieces by French composer Charles-Valentin Alkan and published in 1861. The pieces are divided into four books; the first pair of books and the last pair each comprise between them pieces in each of all the major and minor keys. Book 4 ends with an extra, unnumbered, piece, Laus Deo, in C major. Four pianists have recorded the set in its entirety: Laurent Martin, Osamu Nakamura (now Osamu Kanazawa), Steven Osborne, and Yui Morishita (twice).

Unlike many other of Alkan's pieces, such as the Op. 33 Grand Sonate and the Op. 39 set of etudes in all the minor keys, these 49 pieces do not focus mainly on virtuosity and transcendentalism and instead contain more of Alkan's sentimental and evocative writing. Alkan's innovation is also vividly present in the pieces. The 45th piece, Les Diablotins, features wrenched cluster chords and the 48th piece, En Songe, is a dreamy and quiet piece all except for the very final chord, which is a sudden F major chord with the dynamic ff. The 39th piece, Héraclite et Démocrite, features two sharply contrasting themes for the respective philosophers, and at some passages Alkan overlaps the themes to create a solemn and sad theme in the left hand and a bouncy and joyous theme in the right.

The Esquisses
Book 1
 La Vision in C major
 Le Staccatissimo in F minor
 Le Legatissimo in D major
 Les Cloches in G minor
 Les Initiés in E major (features a quote from Aristophanes' The Frogs instead of a title in some editions)
 Fuguette in A minor
 Le Frisson in F major
 Pseudo-Naïveté in B minor
 Confidence in A major
 Increpatio in C minor
 Les Soupirs in B major
 Barcarollette in E minor
Book 2
Ressouvenir in C minor
 Duettino in F major
 Tutti de Concerto dans le genre ancien in D minor
 Fantasie in G major
 Petit prélude à trois in E minor
 Liedchen in A major
 Grâces in F minor
 Petit marche villageoise in B major
 Morituri te salutant in G minor
 Innocenzia in D major
 L'homme aux sabots in B minor
 Contredanse in E major
Book 3
La poursuite in C major
 Petit air, Genre ancien in G minor
 Rigaudon in D major
 Inflexibilité (also known as Rigidité) in A minor
 Délire in E major
 Petit air dolent in B minor
 Début de quatuor in F major
 Minuetto in C minor
 "Fais dodo" in A major
 Odi profanum vulgus et arceo, Favete linguis in E minor
 Musique militaire in B major
 Toccatina in F minor
Book 4
Scherzettino in C minor
 "Le ciel vous soit toujours prospére" (also known as Les bons souhaits) in G major
 Héraclite et Démocrite in D minor
 "Attendez-moi sous l'orme" in A major
 Les enharmoniques in E minor
 Petit air à 5 voix in B major
 Notturino-Innamorato in F minor
 Transports in C major
 Les diablotins in G minor
 Le premiere billet doux in E major
 Scherzetto in B minor
 En songe in F major
Laus Deo in C major

See also
 List of compositions by Charles-Valentin Alkan
 Music written in all 24 major and minor keys

External links
 
 Playlist of all 49 Esquisses, played by Yui Morishita: https://www.youtube.com/playlist?list=PL-NTwJ11LiqObHF4lxeyQ7dwmEeeoIBzG
 Answers.com: http://www.answers.com/topic/motifs-48-esquisses-sketches-for-piano-in-4-books-op-63

1861 compositions
Compositions by Charles-Valentin Alkan
Alkan
Compositions for solo piano
Compositions that use extended techniques